Rejected (foaled 1950) was an American Thoroughbred racehorse whose wins included the Hollywood Gold Cup in track record time and Santa Anita Handicap, the two most important races in California open to older horses.

Bred and raced by Robert Kleberg's King Ranch, Rejected was trained by future U.S. Racing Hall of Fame inductee, Buddy Hirsch.

References

External links 
 Rejected's pedigree and partial racing stats

1950 racehorse births
Thoroughbred family 2-e
Racehorses bred in the United States
Racehorses trained in the United States